The Huachuca Mountains are part of the Sierra Vista Ranger District of the Coronado National Forest in Cochise County in southeastern Arizona, approximately  south-southeast of Tucson and southwest of the city of Sierra Vista. Included in this area is the highest peak in the Huachucas, Miller Peak, and the region of the Huachucas known as Canelo Hills in eastern Santa Cruz County. The second highest peak in this range is Carr Peak, elevation . The Huachuca Mountain area is managed principally by the United States Forest Service (Coronado National Forest) (41%) and the U.S. Army (Fort Huachuca) (20%), with much of the rest being private land (32%). Sierra Vista is the main population center (43,888 inhabitants as of the 2010 Census).

The Huachuca Mountains were named by the Spanish for a Pima village that once existed to the north of the range near the present location of Elgin, Arizona. Coronado National Memorial is in the southeastern margin of the range near the Mexico–United States border and includes Montezuma Pass, a possible entry point of Francisco Vázquez de Coronado into what is now Arizona in 1540. The range extends a short distance south of the border in Sonora, Mexico.

Vegetation
Vegetation in the Huachucas varies from Chihuahua whitethorn scrub and semi-desert mixed grass/mixed scrub, at the lower elevations, to Encinal mixed oak, and transitions to ponderosa pine and Apache pine at the highest elevations.

Climate data
 Average precipitation: 20" on peaks; 15" at base
 Average high/low winter temperatures (°F): 35/20 on peaks; 60/35 at base
 Average high/low summer temperatures (°F): 75/50 on peaks; 95/65 at base

Recreation

Hiking 
The Huachucas present many hiking possibilities and scenic drives. Some entail narrow dirt roads with switchbacks and pull-outs. Trails climb from all sides of the range to the  Miller Peak Wilderness. Along the trails there are opportunities to see a number of rare butterflies of Arizona (see List of butterflies and moths of Arizona), as well as plants that are more commonly found in the Sierra Madre Occidental. Trails begin on the east side of Ash Canyon, Miller Canyon, Carr Canyon, and Ramsey Canyon roads, from the south at  Montezuma Pass in the Coronado National Memorial, and from the west via Oversite trail, Ida, Bear, and Sunnyside canyons. The  Crest Trail between Montezuma Pass and Fort Huachuca ties all of the trails together. There are some 50 trails altogether. Trail users may encounter immigrants on the mountain trails; no negative incidents have ever been reported by Arizona Trail Association users. The mountains include the type locality for a number of plant species collected by the Lemmons and named by Asa Gray.

Birdwatching 
This area is appreciated for its birdwatching opportunities including some Arizona specialties such as hummingbirds, trogons, and tyrant flycatchers, including  some rare birds such as the blue-throated, white-eared, and berylline hummingbirds; also buff-breasted flycatchers; and black-throated gray, red-faced, and Grace's warblers; also red crossbills and numerous other bird species.

Border wall 
The mountain ecosystem is threatened by both the influx of litter from illegal immigrants and the border barrier being constructed by the administration of Arizona Governor Doug Ducey. Despite lack of authorization from federal authorities, Ducey is constructing a wall of shipping containers along the border on land owned by the United States Forest Service in Coronado National Forest. Ecologists argue that this construction threatened endangered species such as jaguars and ocelots, and therefore violates federal laws such as the Endangered Species Act. For that reason the Center for Biological Diversity has sued to halt construction. 

Construction is expected to stop when governor-elect Katie Hobbs takes office. Hobbs has stated intention to remove the containers after taking office.

Gallery

References

External links
 Trails of the Huachucas. Agave Guides
 WildFire Alternatives, Huachuca Study Area. University of Arizona.
 The Cochise Trail. Arizona Handbook
 The Huachuca Mountains. Virtual Birder.
 Huachuca Trail Segments. Southern Arizona Hiking Club.
 

Mountain ranges of Cochise County, Arizona
Madrean Sky Islands mountain ranges
Coronado National Forest
Mountain ranges of Arizona